The 1970 Alaska gubernatorial election took place on November 3, 1970, for the post of Governor of Alaska. Former governor and Democratic candidate Bill Egan was able to defeat incumbent Republican governor Keith H. Miller after having lost his position in the previous election to Wally Hickel.  Miller had been appointed to fill the rest of Hickel's term after Hickel was nominated to be the U.S. Secretary of the Interior under President Richard Nixon. Miller defeated Representative Howard Wallace Pollock for the Republican nomination.

Results

Results overview

Results by district

References

Gubernatorial
1970
Alaska
November 1970 events in the United States